Aodhán Ó Ríordáin (born 22 July 1976) is an Irish Labour Party politician who has been a Teachta Dála (TD) for the Dublin Bay North constituency since the 2020 general election, and previously from 2011 to 2016 for the Dublin North-Central constituency. He served as Minister of State for Communities, Culture and Equality from 2014 to 2016, and Minister of State at the Department of Health with responsibility for the National Drugs Strategy from 2015 to 2016. He was a Senator for the Industrial and Commercial Panel from 2016 to 2020.

Early life
Aodhán Ó Ríordáin was born on 22 July 1976. In his youth, he had a job as a newspaper delivery boy for the Northside People. In 2014, he spoke of his experiences of being bullied in primary school and secondary school, which he attributes to the fact that he was taller than his peers.

Ó Ríordáin is a former teacher, and was principal of St. Laurence O'Toole's Girls' Primary School.

Political career

Councillor
Ó Ríordáin was a Labour Party member of Dublin City Council for the North Inner City local electoral area from 2004 to 2009 and then for the Clontarf local electoral area from 2009 to 2011. He served as Deputy Lord Mayor of Dublin in 2006, during which time he launched a Right to Read Campaign in an effort to improve the poor literacy rates in disadvantaged areas.

TD
His move in 2009 to the Clontarf local electoral area positioned Ó Ríordáin to run for election to Dáil Éireann in the Dublin North-Central constituency, which he did at the 2011 general election; he took the second seat on the fourth count with 10,192 votes. As a member of the Labour Party backbenches, he served as vice-chairperson of the Oireachtas Committee on Education and Social Protection and as a member of both the Finance, Public Expenditure and Reform Committee and the Good Friday Agreement Implementation Committee. He was re-elected as a TD for the Dublin Bay North constituency in the 2020 General Election.

On 28 April 2013, the Sunday Independent reported that Ó Ríordáin was secretly recorded by an anti-abortion activist as stating that the Protection of Life During Pregnancy Bill was only "the starting point" on abortion, but that he would not state this publicly.

Minister of State
On 15 July 2014, Ó Ríordáin was appointed Minister of State with responsibility for New Communities, Culture and Equality at the Department of Justice and Equality and at the Department of Arts, Heritage and the Gaeltacht. As Minister of State he prioritised reforming the direct provision system, ending the legal entitlement of Church-controlled state-funded institutions to discriminate against LGBT people, and played a key role in the Yes campaign in the 2015 Marriage Equality Referendum. He coordinated the Polska Éire 2015 festival, which was a week-long cultural and sporting festival in the run-up to the March 2015 Republic of Ireland v. Poland UEFA European Championship qualifier.

On 22 April 2015, Ó Ríordáin was appointed as Minister of State at the Department of Health, with responsibility for the National Drugs Strategy, in addition to his existing ministerial duties.

Seanad Éireann
Ó Ríordáin's bid for re-election to the Dáil in Dublin Bay North at the 2016 general election was unsuccessful. He remained as a Minister of State until the formation 
of a new government of 6 May. He was nominated by the Labour Party for election to Seanad Éireann. In April 2016, he was elected to the 25th Seanad on the Industrial and Commercial Panel.

After Brendan Howlin was elected unopposed as Labour leader, he appointed Ó Ríordáin as Spokesperson on Environment and Sustainable Development, and Gaeltacht Affairs.

On 10 November 2016, following the United States presidential election, Ó Ríordáin made a public statement in the Seanad that went viral on social media, in which he labelled President-elect Donald Trump as a "fascist" and a "monster", quoting Edmund Burke's attributed maxim that "the only way evil can prosper is for good men to do nothing". He condemned Trump's statements threatening to imprison his opponent, former Secretary of State Hillary Clinton, barring Muslims from entering the country, mass deportations, and his assertions that the media and the political system were rigged. Describing current events as an "ugly political crossroads", Ó Ríordáin declared that he was "embarrassed" and "frightened" by the reaction of Taoiseach Enda Kenny and the government, and sarcastically remarked that the government's reaction was to "ring [the U.S. government] up and ask them if it's okay to still bring the shamrock on St. Patrick's Day". He applauded SDLP leader Colum Eastwood's statement that his party would boycott the St. Patrick's Day ceremony at the White House during Trump's presidency.

On 26 October 2017, speaking in the Seanad regarding a mortgage lending scandal, Ó Ríordáin referred to the bankers as a "shower of bastards" who are "getting away with murder, year in year out, in this democracy". He was admonished by Cathaoirleach Denis O'Donovan for using unparliamentary language.

Return as TD and Labour Party leadership contest
Ó Ríordáin was elected for the Dublin Bay North constituency at the 2020 general election, getting 11.3% of the first preference vote.  After Brendan Howlin's intention to stand down as party leader following the 2020 general election, Ó Ríordáin was nominated to contest the leadership election by Ged Nash and Ivana Bacik. Ó Ríordáin was also publicly supported by former Labour TD Liz McManus and former lord mayor of Dublin Andrew Montague. Launching his election bid, Ó Ríordáin said that Labour needed to rebuild its relationship with the public and had to get people to "trust us again". On 3 April 2020, it was announced that Ó Ríordáin had received 45% of the vote, with Alan Kelly the winner on 55%.

Political views

Drug policy 
Ó Riordáin is an advocate for legalisation of cannabis. In 2017, he called for cannabis to be legalised, in order to "cut the knees from under drug gangs".

Ó Riordáin has advocated for the decriminalisation of small amounts of other drugs. As a minister with responsibility for the National Drugs Strategy, Ó Riordáin brought forward legislation to create several safer injection centres, describing the treatment of drug addicts as criminals as "insanity". In a piece in TheJournal, Ó Riordáin criticised the "war on drugs", mentioning a case where a young man was charged in court with possession of €2 worth of cannabis, describing it as a "waste of Garda time". After the release of the National Drugs Strategy in 2017, which outlined the option of decriminalisation, he described addicts as people "who should be surrounded with compassion".

Education 
Ó Riordáin put forward a bill in 2018 to tackle school absenteeism, which the government accepted and passed.

During the COVID-19 pandemic, Ó Ríordáin successfully campaigned for Ireland's free school meals campaign to be extended across summer. As Labour's spokesperson on education, Ó Riordáin has called for single-sex schools to be abolished, saying that they are "part of the problem" of gender inequality. He branded education minister Norma Foley and the government a "bad debs committee" in the Dáil over their ruling on mask-wearing in primary schools.

In November 2021, Alphonsus Cullinan, the Catholic Bishop of Waterford and Lismore accused Ó Ríordáin of "almost inciting hatred" for suggesting religious patronage should be removed from schools, referring to a speech Ó Ríordáin made at the 2021 Labour conference. He shouted "Let’s get them out" during the speech. Cullinan wrote a letter of complaint to party leader Alan Kelly. Ó Ríordáin stated that he did not name any particular religious group.

Other activities
On 28 March 2018, Paddy Jackson and his co-accused were found not guilty of rape and other charges. Following the verdict Ó Riordáin sent a tweet praising the complainant and questioning the jury's decision. In response Jackson's solicitors have announced that he intends to sue Ó Riordáin for defamation following a tweet Ó Riordáin made following Jackson's acquittal.

Personal life
He is married to Áine Kerr, and they have one child.

References

External links

Aodhán Ó Ríordáin's page on the Labour Party website

 

1976 births
Living people
Alumni of University College Dublin
Heads of schools in Ireland
Labour Party (Ireland) senators
Labour Party (Ireland) TDs
Local councillors in Dublin (city)
Members of the 25th Seanad
Members of the 31st Dáil
Members of the 33rd Dáil
Ministers of State of the 31st Dáil